Advanced Placement (AP) Physics C: Mechanics (also known as AP C Mechanics, AP Mechanics, or  just AP Physics C) is an Advanced Placement science course in which students study Newtonian mechanics. It is one of the AP Physics courses offered in some U.S. secondary schools.

Course content
Intended to be equivalent to an introductory college course in mechanics for physics or engineering majors, the course modules are:
 Kinematics 
 Newton's laws of motion 
 Work, energy and power 
 Systems of particles and linear momentum 
 Circular motion and rotation 
 Oscillations and gravitation.

Methods of calculus are used wherever appropriate in formulating physical principles and in applying them to physical problems. Therefore, students should have completed or be concurrently enrolled in a Calculus I class.

This course is often compared to AP Physics 1: Algebra Based for its similar course material involving kinematics, work, motion, forces, rotation, and oscillations. However, AP Physics 1: Algebra Based lacks concepts found in Calculus I, like derivatives or integrals.

This course may be combined with AP Physics C: Electricity and Magnetism to make a unified Physics C course that prepares for both exams.

AP test

The course culminates in an optional exam for which high-performing students may receive some credit towards their college coursework, depending on the institution.

Registration
The AP examination for AP Physics C: Mechanics is separate from the AP examination for AP Physics C: Electricity and Magnetism. Before 2006, test-takers paid only once and were given the choice of taking either one or two parts of the Physics C test.

Format
The exam is typically administered on a Monday afternoon in May. The exam is configured in two categories: a 35-question multiple choice section and a 3-question free response section.  Test takers are allowed to use an approved calculator during the entire exam. The test is weighted such that each section is worth fifty percent (50%) of the final score.  Additionally, tables of equations, information, and constants are provided for all portions of the exam as of 2015. This and AP Physics C: Electricity and Magnetism are the shortest AP exams, with total testing time of 90 minutes.

The topics covered by the exam are as follows:

As a result of the 2019-20 coronavirus pandemic, the AP examination in 2020 was taken online. The topics of oscillations and gravitation were removed from the test.

Grade distribution
The grade distributions since 2010 were:

See also 
Physics
Glossary of physics

References

External links
College Board Course Description: Physics C

Advanced Placement
Physics education
Standardized tests